John Vanderpool was a barber, laborer, and state legislator in South Carolina. He represented Charleston County, South Carolina in the South Carolina House of Representatives from 1872 to 1877.

He was part of a group of people authorized by South Carolina's general assembly to establish a wharf at Cainhoy on the Wando River.

He was also one of the incorporators of Toglio Ferry Company from Charleston to islands nearby.

See also
African-American officeholders during and following the Reconstruction era

References

Year of birth missing
Year of death missing
African-American politicians during the Reconstruction Era
Members of the South Carolina House of Representatives
People from Charleston County, South Carolina
African-American state legislators in South Carolina
Barbers